The World Freestyle Football Association (WFFA) is the international governing body of freestyle football.   

Freestyle football is defined as an art and sport, which involves participants creatively juggling a ball using all parts of the body to entertain audiences and outperform opponents; it combines street culture of football tricks, dance, acrobatics and music.

Organisation
The WFFA develops and manages the Official World Rankings System, the World Freestyle Day (held annually on 1 September), all rules and regulations of official WFFA competitions, and the key WFFA events across the calendar.

The WFFA is a non-profit organisation, headquartered in Ontario, Canada).

Membership
The organisation operates throughout 114 countries  (as of January 2019) with the mission of growing awareness and participation in the sport of freestyle football  for both male and females of all ages. The ambition for the sport to be used as a tool for positive social change in communities worldwide.  The Key Leaders in each country have a role to play in the overall governance of the sport, by casting votes on any rule changing matters and contributing new ideas to grow the sport in their regions. The structure and worldwide network for the sport has been in development since 2007.

Events
WFFA football events can be Open or Closed events. All Open-events (National, Continental and World) allow participants to score World Ranking points, whilst all Closed-events are invitation-only for pre-qualified or elite athletes. Events can take place live or online. Events annually receive over 200 million engagements online and connect to audience across the world through social media platforms like Facebook, Instagram, and YouTube.

The key events in the freestyle football calendar include:

Super Ball, Prague, Czech Republic.

Panther Ball, Torreon, Mexico.

Freestyle Football World Masters.

Red Bull Street Style World Finals.

Women's Freestyle League.

European Freestyle Football Championship.

Asia-Pacific Freestyle Football Championship.

South American Freestyle Football Championship.

North American Freestyle Football Championship.

African Freestyle Football Championship.

National WFFA Championships in all countries.

Ambassadors
In 2014, Ronaldinho joined WFFA as a global ambassador. More celebrity names from the worlds of football, music, and entertainment have also shown their support for Freestyle Football at events.

References

External links
 Official Website

Association football terminology
Association football governing bodies
International sports organizations
Sports organizations of Canada
Sports organizations established in 2017
2017 establishments in Ontario